Gastón Gómez (born 4 March 1996) is an Argentine professional footballer who plays as a goalkeeper for Argentine Primera División side Racing Club.

Career
Gómez started his career with Racing Club. After being promoted into the club's first-team in 2017, he was first an unused substitute for an Argentine Primera División match with San Lorenzo on 27 May. Less than a week later, Gómez made his professional debut in the Copa Sudamericana against Rionegro Águilas; he was subbed on early following an injury to Juan Musso. He made his first three appearances in league football in June 2017, featuring in matches against River Plate, Colón and Banfield.

Career statistics
.

References

External links

1996 births
Living people
Sportspeople from Mar del Plata
Argentine footballers
Association football goalkeepers
Argentine Primera División players
Racing Club de Avellaneda footballers